Yenne is a commune in the Savoie department in the Auvergne-Rhône-Alpes region in south-eastern France. It is located on the east side of the Rhône, by the "Gorges de la Balme."

Population

See also
Communes of the Savoie department

References

External links

Communes of Savoie